KUJ may refer to: 

 KUJ (AM), a radio station (1420 AM) licensed to Walla Walla, Washington, United States
 KUJ-FM, a radio station (99.1 FM) licensed to Burbank, Washington, United States
 Keeping up with the Joneses
kuj, ISO 630 code for the Kuria language